LionTree LLC is an American investment banking firm that has a focus on industries related to technology, media and telecommunications (TMT). Although the firm is based in the United States, it also has a significant presence in Europe.  LionTree also has a media company called Kindred Media.

History

LionTree was founded in June 2012 by Aryeh Bourkoff, former head of UBS’s investment banking in the Americas, alongside fellow UBS alum, Ehren Stenzler who joined in July 2012.

In 2016, LionTree opened additional offices in San Francisco and London. In 2017, an office in Paris was opened.

During the same year, LionTree founded Ocelot Partners, a special-purpose acquisition company that focuses on investment opportunities in the European TMT sector, along with Andrew Barron and Martin E. Franklin. In March 2018, Ocelot Partners acquired Ocean Outdoor, a U.K.-based digital billboard company, from Searchlight Capital.

Business overview

LionTree is involved in both investment banking as well as merchant banking.

The investment banking unit is called LionTree Advisors and provides services such as mergers and acquisitions, capital raisings, and initial public offerings.

LionTree Partners acts as the investment arm of Liontree. It mainly invests in companies from the TMT sector.

In 2017, LionTree started its own media company, Kindred Media which produces the KindredCast podcast.

LionTree Advisors deals 

Altice acquisition of Suddenlink Communications.
CK Hutchison acquisition of Italian mobile operator, Wind Tre.
 Verizon acquisition of AOL and Yahoo!
 Liberty Global acquisition of Virgin Media.
 Merger of Liberty Global and Vodafone Netherlands to form VodafoneZiggo.
Lionsgate acquisition of Starz.
Snap Inc's initial public offering.
BC Partners acquisition of CenturyLink’s data centers and colocation business.
NBCUniversal's investment in Buzzfeed
 Charter Communications acquisition of Time Warner Cable and Bright House networks.
SiriusXM acquisition of Pandora.
TDC Group delisting by buyout from a consortium of Danish Pension Funds.
2019 merger of CBS and Viacom.
 AT&T spinning off its WarnerMedia business in order to merge with Discovery Inc to form Warner Bros. Discovery
Sale of ViacomCBS' book-publishing division, Simon & Schuster to Penguin Random House (part of Bertelsmann).
 Apollo Global Management acquisition of  the Yahoo and AOL brands from Verizon.
 Amazon acquisition of MGM studios.
 Take-Two Interactive acquisition of Zynga.
 New York Times acquisition of The Athletic.

LionTree Partners investments 

 Artsy
 Astra
 Atlas Obscura
 ATTN:
 Blade
 Clear Secure, Inc.
 Community
 Cross River Bank
 FACEIT
 Fanatics, Inc.
 FuboTV
 GetYourGuide
 Gimlet Media
 Oatly
 Oscar Health
 Pluto TV
 Sofar Sounds
 Splice
 The Athletic
 W magazine

References

External links

Investment banks in the United States
American companies established in 2012
Financial services companies established in 2012
Companies based in Manhattan